Andraž Krapež (born 12 January 1997) is a Slovenian badminton player.
He trained at the BIT badminton club, and in 2014 he competed at the Summer Youth Olympics in Nanjing, China. In 2017, he won his first international title at the Romanian International tournament in the men's doubles event partnered with Samatcha Tovannakasem of Thailand. Krapež was a bronze medalists at the 2022 Mediterranean Games.

Achievements

Mediterranean Games 
Men's singles

BWF International Challenge/Series 
Men's singles

Men's doubles

  BWF International Challenge tournament
  BWF International Series tournament
  BWF Future Series tournament

References

External links 
 

1997 births
Living people
Slovenian male badminton players
Badminton players at the 2014 Summer Youth Olympics
Competitors at the 2022 Mediterranean Games
Mediterranean Games bronze medalists for Slovenia
Mediterranean Games medalists in badminton
21st-century Slovenian people